Heythrop College, University of London, was a constituent college of the University of London between 1971 and 2018, last located in Kensington Square, London. It comprised the university's specialist faculties of philosophy and theology with social sciences, offering undergraduate and postgraduate degree courses and five specialist institutes and centres to promote research. It had a close affiliation with the Roman Catholic Church, through the British Province of the Society of Jesus (Jesuits) whose scholarly tradition went back to a 1614 exiled foundation in Belgium and whose extensive library collections it housed. While maintaining its denominational links and ethos the college welcomed all faiths and perspectives, women as well as men.

Through Heythrop's close links with the Jesuits, it also served as the London centre for Fordham University, a Jesuit university in the United States. Other external groups, including A Call To Action (ACTA, British Catholic Association), also used meeting facilities on the site.

Following unsuccessful negotiations with St Mary's University, Twickenham, another British university, and amid some controversy, in June 2015 the college's governing body decided that the college would cease to be an independent constituent of the University of London, in 2018. It formally terminated operations and left the University of London on 31 January 2019. It was the first significant UK higher education institution to completely close permanently (not including mergers and name changes) since the dissolution of the original University of Northampton in 1265.

Twentieth-century name

The English province of the Society of Jesus bought the dilapidated house and grounds in 1926 as a training centre for their scholastics. During its stay, the house was altered and enlarged, not always in a style sympathetic to the original architectural concept. In 1926 two wings were added to the north front built of Hornton ironstone from north Oxfordshire, much darker and browner than the stone used to build the original house in the 18th century.

In 1952, the indoor real tennis court was converted into a chapel and in 1965, a library was added. In 1960, two halls of residence were added in the grounds in contemporary style.

In 1970 the Jesuit province moved its facilities to London after it had negotiated for the centre's faculties of theology and philosophy to become part of London University. It sold its Oxfordshire estate to the National Westminster Bank Group which turned the house and its precincts into a training and conference centre.

History

Beginnings in exile

Due to continuing anti-Catholic repercussions during the reign of James I, a network of English religious schools was established in Western Europe. Likewise the Society of Jesus preferred to establish its school for boys and its faculties of theology and philosophy for training English Jesuit candidates abroad. William Baldwin (1563–1632) was a professor of moral theology at the college in Louvain. He, like Gerard, was implicated in the Gunpowder Plot.

In 1624 the English Jesuit college obtained patronage from Maximilian I, Elector of Bavaria, and his wife, hence the colours of the elector's coat of arms were incorporated into its own coat of arms. The Liège college was protected in the Austrian Netherlands and continued relatively undisturbed for 178 years, through the suppression of the Society of Jesus in 1773 under the personal authority of Bishop François-Charles de Velbrück, until French troops surrounded the city in 1794.
Notable teachers and alumni included:
 John Carroll (1735–1815), first Roman Catholic bishop (and Archbishop of Baltimore) in the United States and founder of Georgetown University
 Charles Carroll (1737–1832), Maryland delegate and one of the signatories of the Declaration of Independence 
 Charles Plowden (1743–1821), Jesuit priest, writer and administrator; first rector at Stonyhurst
 Francis Plowden, Jesuit priest, barrister and writer. Taught at the college during the suppression of the Society of Jesus
 John Howard SJ was head of Liège College (1773–1783)
 William Strickland SJ was head of Liège College (1783–1790)
 Marmaduke Stone SJ (1748–1834), final director of the college (1790–1794), led the evacuation to England

Repatriation to England and Wales

During the French Revolutionary Wars, the continuity of the college is owed principally to two men: Marmaduke Stone SJ, who led the Liège college move to England in 1794 and an Old Boy of Watten and Bruges English College, Thomas Weld (of Lulworth), who generously donated his family seat, of Stonyhurst, a property in Lancashire, where the evacuees settled for the foreseeable future. While the environment in England was benign for Catholics, the Catholic Church now considered them "ex-Jesuits". They resolved therefore to accept the authority of the only remaining valid Jesuit province which was in the Russian Empire under superiors, Gabriel Gruber and Tadeusz Brzozowski. The latter became Superior General of the Society of Jesus in 1814, although still confined to Russia, when Pope Pius VII lifted the ban on the order. The former Liège college staff located its faculties on two sites, philosophy at Stonyhurst College in Lancashire and theology at St Beuno's College in Denbighshire.

In 1840, Stonyhurst was recognised as an affiliated college of the University of London, which had been created in 1836. This allowed students to sit examinations for University of London degrees. Among the notable teaching staff were:
 Henry James Coleridge (1822–1893), professor of Scripture, religious preacher and writer
 Alfred Weld (1823–1890), professor of Science and Astronomy, Director of the Stonyhurst Observatory, grandson of the College founder
 Sylvester Joseph Hunter (1829–1896), Jesuit priest and educator
 John Morris (1826–1893) taught canon law in 1867
 George Tyrrell (1861–1909), an Irish Jesuit, taught philosophy at Stonyhurst (until his expulsion from the Jesuits) and was condemned for Modernism
 Franz Xavier Wernz (1842–1914), professor of canon law in 1882 at St Beuno's. He served as the 25th Superior General of the Society of Jesus and was rector of the Pontifical Gregorian University, Rome

Among its alumni were:
 James Brodrick (1891–1973), Jesuit priest and historian
 Richard Clarke (1839–1900), Jesuit priest and theologian. First Master of Campion Hall, Oxford
 Aloysius Cortie (1859–1925), Jesuit priest and astronomer 
 Gerard Manley Hopkins (1844–1899), Jesuit priest, poet and professor  
 Joseph Rickaby (1845–1932), Jesuit priest and philosopher
 Martin D'Arcy SJ (1888–1976) was a philosopher of love, and a correspondent, friend, and adviser of a range of literary and artistic figures including Evelyn Waugh, Dorothy L. Sayers, W. H. Auden, Eric Gill and Sir Edwin Lutyens. He has been described as "perhaps England's foremost Catholic public intellectual from the 1930s until his death".

Heythrop years
In 1926, the faculties came together at Heythrop Hall, Oxfordshire. As a Collegium Maximum, the college's right to admit its students to degrees was confirmed by the Holy See in 1932. In 1964, the college was raised to the status of a Pontifical Athenaeum, named as the Heythrop Faculties of Theology and Philosophy, open to lay men and women and clerics from outside the Society of Jesus. However, the college now also sought integration with the British educational system.

Rectors and principals, 1926–1970
1926–1937: Edward Helsham SJ
1937–1944: Ignatius Scoles SJ
1944–1950: Edward Enright SJ
1950–1952: Desmond Boyle SJ
1952–1959: John Diamond SJ
1959–1964: David Hoy SJ
1964–1970: William Maher SJ

Alumni, 1926–1970 

 John A. Saliba, Jesuit priest and professor of religious studies
 Salvino Azzopardi (1931–2006), Jesuit priest and philosopher
 Frederick Copleston (1907–1994), Jesuit priest, philosopher and historian
 Ralph Coverdale (1918–1975), soldier, behavioural psychologist, management consultant and trainer
 Mark Elvins (1939–2014), Warden of Greyfriars, Oxford
 Clarence Gallagher, Jesuit priest and theologian. Former Dean of the Faculty of Canon Law and Rector of the Pontifical Oriental Institute (1990–1995).
 Gerard W. Hughes (1924–2014), Jesuit priest, spiritual guide and author of God of Surprises
 Paul Lakeland (1946– ), Professor and Chair of the centre for Catholic studies of Fairfield University
 Peter Levi (1931–2000), former Jesuit priest, poet, archaeologist, travel writer, biographer, critic and Professor of Poetry at the University of Oxford
 Bernard Lonergan (1904–1984), Jesuit priest, philosopher and theologian
 Peter Milward (1925–2017), Jesuit priest and literary scholar
 Joseph A. Munitiz (1931-2022), Jesuit priest, theologian and librarian. Former editor of the Heythrop Journal and master of Campion Hall, Oxford
 Gerald O'Collins (born 1931), Jesuit priest, author, academic, and educator
 Stephen Perry (1833–1889), Jesuit priest and astronomer
 James J. Quinn (1919–2010), Jesuit priest, theologian and hymnwriter
 Frederick Turner (1911–2001), Jesuit priest, archivist, librarian and former headmaster at Stonyhurst College
 Edward Yarnold (1926–2002), former Master of Campion Hall, Oxford from 1965–72

Constituent of the University of London 
For this purpose it moved to London in 1970, and obtained a royal charter of incorporation as a "school" of the University of London in the faculties of theology and arts on 11 March 1971. It began to award University of London degrees. After its move to London, to a Grade II listed Georgian townhouse, a former convent, at nos. 11–13 Cavendish Square in the Marylebone area, the college retained the name "Heythrop College".
In 1993 the college moved to its final location, in the Maria Assumpta Centre at 23 Kensington Square, initially sharing the site with several other organisations, most notably the Westminster Pastoral Foundation (WPF), a reputable and long-established counselling training institute. In 2000 Heythrop College announced it needed more space for its library and delicate negotiations began with WPF. The college had assembled one of the largest philosophy and theology-related libraries in Britain. 
Eight years later, WPF were finally persuaded to uproot and vacate their extensive purpose-built premises, about a quarter of the Maria Assumpta site.

In January 2014, the college received decrees from the Congregation for Catholic Education of the Holy See officially reactivating its ecclesiastical faculties under the patronage of saint Robert Bellarmine. These ecclesiastical faculties were grouped together as the Bellarmine Institute. In June 2014, Heythrop College celebrated the 400th anniversary of its two original faculties. While the college still retained the English Jesuits' original function of training future priests of the Catholic Church, its contemporary teaching staff and student body had become much wider, more international and diverse.

The college ran into financial difficulties in the 2010s due to the changes in higher education in the United Kingdom. Undergraduate student recruitment declined after the cap on tuition fees was raised to £9,000 per annum in 2012, resulting in the Society of Jesus subsidising the college with millions of pounds: Claire Ozanne, the college's final principal, also highlighted the impact of the administrative burden of quality assurance assessments such as the Teaching and Research Excellence Frameworks on small institutions like Heythrop. Despite explorations with other academies, strategic partnership talks with St Mary's University, Twickenham, and an offer from the University of Roehampton for Heythrop to affiliate as one of its constituent colleges, no solution was found and in 2015 the decision was made to wind down and close by 2019.

Maria Assumpta campus 

The site was previously entirely owned by the Religious of the Assumption, a religious order of sisters founded in France by Saint Marie-Eugénie de Jésus. The Sisters originally ran a convent school and later a teacher training college on the mainly residential Victorian site, known for decades as The Maria Assumpta Centre. A number of the sisters continue to live on the site, and their Marie Eugénie Chapel was available for student use. A chaplaincy was provided for all College students, in addition to the University of London chaplaincy, along with an Islamic Prayer room.

Unlike many University of London colleges, Heythrop College managed in 2008, on the termination of their lease and the vacation of its premises by WPF, to take over the majority of facilities on the Maria Assumpta Kensington site. All lecture rooms, the students' union, the dining hall, previously shared with WPF and other tenant organisations, in the Victorian buildings in Kensington Square, came under its exclusive management. The College also took over the Alban Hall of residence, previously operated by the Sisters for women students only, which became briefly the College's sole residential accommodation for a proportion of its selected student body.

Library 
The college library comprising some 180,000 volumes, made it one of the largest theology and philosophy libraries in the United Kingdom. Some of its collections date back to the founding of the faculties in 1614. Between 2008 and 2018, the collections were housed in two buildings: the theology, social sciences and literature collections were held in the "Copleston Wing" of the college, formerly the main part of the WPF Training Centre, while philosophy collections were held in the Maria Assumpta Library in the main building. Heythrop also held many of its more precious volumes outside London, in the college repository in Egham, Surrey. It had a large and important collection of pre-1801 books, such as Edward Baddeley's collections and a first edition of Isaac Newton's Opticks. Heythrop students were also able to access the Senate House Library, and the libraries of other colleges of the university due to the college's special status.

Since the College's closure the library's collections have been available through the Senate House Library. As the former college library is still owned by the Jesuits in Britain, they have also made most of the collection available through the Heythrop Library reading room at the London Jesuit Centre. The earliest printed books have been deposited at Campion Hall, Oxford.

Academic profile 
Heythrop prepared students for a range of specialist taught and research degrees. The college had five specialist institutes and centres which promoted research, conferences and a variety of educational outreach activities. These were the:
 Centre for Christianity and Inter-religious Dialogue
 Centre for Eastern Christianity
 Centre for Philosophy of Religion
 Religious Life Institute 
 Heythrop Institute for Religion and Society

All of the institutes conducted research in their own field.

The college offered full-time, and part-time courses through a combination of lectures, seminars and tutorials, including one-to-one tutorials.

The college had a growing research profile in its final years. It participated in the most recent Research Excellence Framework (2014) and gained considerable recognition for its research. The combined results for all elements of the REF placed Heythrop at 16th in the overall ranking for the Theology & Religious Studies unit of assessment. Overall, 22% of its research outputs was deemed world-leading and a further 40% was deemed internationally excellent. The research works recognised in its submission reflected efforts in both its Theology and Philosophy departments.

Department of Philosophy 
The department offered a variety of specialist philosophy degrees with students attached to one of the Centres at the College,  embracing both the continental and analytic traditions, and the history of philosophy.

Department of Theology 
In addition to theology, religious studies and ethics, Heythrop was the first college in the world to offer undergraduate and postgraduate degree courses focused on the Abrahamic Religions led by members of each of the three Abrahamic faiths. The Theology department also offered a Divinity programme to candidates for the Catholic priesthood, making it a centre of Roman Catholic training and learning in the United Kingdom.

Pastoral and social studies 
The college had a distinctive history and range of teaching in pastoral theology and allied disciplines, with a profile in the United Kingdom and internationally. The Pastoral and Social Studies Department offered degree programmes in the following fields: pastoral theology and practical theology, including:
 Sociology of religion
 Christian spirituality
 Ethics
 Liturgy
 Canon law and psychology, including a specialism in the psychology of religion.

Bellarmine Institute 
The Bellarmine Institute, named after St.Robert Bellarmine, was the new name given to the Heythrop ecclesiastical Faculties of Theology and Philosophy in 2013. After moving to London and becoming established as a constituent college of the University of London, the Faculties had become dormant. They were reactivated on 17 September 2013 by a decree of the Congregation for Catholic Education of the Holy See, expanding the opportunities and teaching the college could offer to seminarians, priestly candidates and others. Before the closure of the college, it had been announced that the Society of Jesus, the college governors and the Archbishop of Westminster would look for ways for the ecclesiastical faculties to continue.

The institute offered degree programmes in theology and philosophy, intended for Catholic ordinands, those already engaged in church ministry and other scholars. The ecclesiastical degree programmes offered covered all three cycles for priestly formation in the Catholic Church.
     
 Baccalaureate in Sacred Theology (STB)
 Licentiate in Sacred Theology (STL)
 Doctor of Sacred Theology (STD)  
 Baccalaureate in Philosophy (BacPhil)
 Licentiate in Philosophy (PhL)
 Doctor of Philosophy (PhD)

In July 2019 both faculties were transferred to St Mary's University Twickenham and renamed Mater Ecclesiae College.

Public lectures 
The college hosted a number of free public lectures, research seminars and study days throughout the year on a variety of philosophical and theological topics. Concurrently, Heythrop ran a number of paid events that were open to the general public.

Heythrop College ran the Loschert Lecture, a lecture series delivered by eminent philosophers, theologians and people of faith. The series was intended to reflect from a consciously Christian perspective, on significant social, political and ethical issues in society. The series was named after William Loschert, chairman of the trustees of the London Centre of Fordham University, who donated the funding for the lectures. Lecturers included Charles Margrave Taylor, Baroness Scotland, Peter Sutherland and David Brennan.

The Heythrop Journal 
Heythrop College sponsored The Heythrop Journal, an international philosophy and theology academic journal. Published on a bimonthly basis, The Heythrop Journal was founded in 1960 by Bruno Brinkman as a format for research on the relational dialogue between philosophy and theology. Still retaining this original function, the current editor is Patrick Madigan, who was a faculty member of Heythrop College. , the journal continues to be published.<ref>{{cite web|url=https://onlinelibrary.wiley.com/toc/14682265/current|title=The Heythrop Journal': current issue|publisher=Wiley|access-date=5 April 2019}}</ref>

 Student activities 
Apart from its students' union, Heythrop's students established their in-house newspaper, The Lion, in 2010. It won the NUS "Best Student Media" award in 2011. In 2015, The Lion ceased publication.

 Closure 
In September 2013, Heythrop College announced that it would stop recruiting undergraduates for University of London degrees, noting its then discussions about a "strategic partnership" with St Mary's University, Twickenham. The initiative was attributed to financial difficulties the College faced as an autonomous college of the University of London. In June 2017 it was confirmed that the college would close in October 2018, with no plans to transfer any departments or continue elsewhere. Heythrop ultimately closed at the end of the 2017/18 academic year, with the final graduations taking place at Senate House on 12 December 2018. From 1 August 2017, the University of London took over the academic sanction previously granted by Heythrop College for the Bachelor of Divinity and related Diploma and Certificate of Higher Education programmes offered through the University of London (Worldwide).

The site (on prime Kensington real estate) was sold, with some of the proceeds reverting to the Religious of the Assumption. While Westbourne Capital Partners applied to redevelop the site as a luxury retirement complex, this was later refused by the Mayor of London.

 Notable people 

College faculty, 1971–2019

 Elizabeth Burns, lecturer in philosophy of religion
 Brendan Callaghan SJ principal 1985–1997, 1998–1999
 Alan Carter, head of the philosophy department
 Dan Cohn-Sherbok, visiting research fellow
 Frederick Copleston SJ principal 1970–1974
 John Cottingham, professorial research fellow
 Johannes Hoff, professor of systematic theology
 Michael Holman SJ principal 2010–2017
 Kevin T. Kelly, lecturer in moral theology
 Stephen Law, reader in philosophy
 William Maher SJ principal 1975–1976
 John Mahoney SJ principal 1976–1981

 John McDade SJ principal 1999–2010
 Christopher Moss SJ principal 1997–1998* Claire Ozanne principal 2017–2019
 Martyn Percy, professorial research fellow
 Philip Sheldrake, religious historian and theologian. Moulsdale Professorial fellow, University of Durham
 Janet Soskice, philosophy of religion and ethics
 George Stack, governor of the college
 Peter Vardy, vice-principal and senior lecturer in philosophy
 Francis Walker SJ, principal 1981–1985
 Keith Ward, professorial research fellow. Former Regius Professor of Divinity at Oxford

Notable alumni
have included:
 Polycarpus Augin Aydin (born 1971), Metropolitan and Patriarchal Vicar for the Archdiocese of the Netherlands of the Syriac Orthodox Church

 William Bentinck, Viscount Woodstock (born 1984), writer, social entrepreneur and heir to the Earldom of Portland
 Joseph Buttigieg (1947–2019), scholar, teacher
 Brendan Callaghan (born 1948), Jesuit priest and psychologist
 Bernt Ivar Eidsvig (born 1953), Roman Catholic Bishop of Oslo
 Michael Charles Evans (1951–2011), Roman Catholic Bishop of East Anglia
 Charles Jason Gordon, Roman Catholic priest, appointed Archbishop of Port of Spain in 2017
 Sebastian Gorka (born 1970), former adviser to Viktor Orbán and Deputy Assistant to President Donald Trump
 Robert Hannigan (born 1965), Director of GCHQ (2014–2017)
 Matt Malone, S.J,. Jesuit priest and current editor-in-chief of America Magazine John Anthony McGuckin (born 1952), Orthodox Christian priest, academic and poet
 David William Parry (born 1958), pastor, poet and dramaturge
 Malcolm Patrick McMahon (born 1949), Roman Catholic Archbishop of Liverpool formerly Bishop of Nottingham
 Michael Anthony Moxon (1942–2019), Anglican Dean of Truro Cathedral
 Dame Sarah Mullally, Anglican Bishop of London (since 2018)
 Martin Newland (born 1961), journalist and editor of The National''
 Catherine Pepinster (1959– ), editor and writer on religion
 Keith Riglin (born 1957), Anglican Bishop of Argyll and The Isles
 Lindsay Urwin (born 1956), Anglican Bishop of Horsham
 Dominic Walker (born 1948), former Anglican Bishop of Reading and Bishop of Monmouth
 Alan Williams, Roman Catholic Bishop of Brentwood

See also 
 Campion Hall, Oxford
 Campion House
 Colleges of St Omer, Bruges and Liège
 Jesuit universities
 Jesuit University System
 Parkstead House
 Pontifical university
 List of Jesuit sites
 List of University of London people
 St Michael and St John Church, Clitheroe

References

External links 

Heythrop: A Detailed History
Heythrop Students Union

 
Defunct universities and colleges in London
Heythrop
Former colleges of the University of London
Educational institutions established in the 1610s
Education in Leuven
Education in Liège
Stonyhurst College
Educational institutions established in the 17th century
Educational institutions established in 1971
1971 establishments in England
Religion in the Royal Borough of Kensington and Chelsea
Catholic seminaries in England
Education in the Royal Borough of Kensington and Chelsea
History of the Royal Borough of Kensington and Chelsea
Grade II listed buildings in the Royal Borough of Kensington and Chelsea
Pontifical universities
Charities based in London
Jesuit universities and colleges in England
Catholic Church in London
Catholic seminaries
Catholic universities and colleges
Educational institutions disestablished in 2019